Mark Ridley (born 1956) is a British zoologist and writer on evolution.

He studied at both Oxford and Cambridge in the 1980s (his doctoral advisor being Richard Dawkins), and later worked at Emory University.  he worked as a research assistant at the Department of Zoology, Oxford University. Ridley has worked on the evolution of reproductive behaviour and written a number of popular accounts of evolutionary biology, including articles for the New York Times, The Sunday Times, Nature, New Scientist and The Times Literary Supplement. He is sometimes confused with Matt Ridley, another writer on evolution who is also from the UK.

Published works
 Ridley, Mark 1993. Evolution Blackwell; 2nd ed 1996 Blackwell ; 3rd ed 2003 Wiley . A comprehensive textbook: case studies, commentary, dedicated website and CD.
 Mendel's Demon: Gene Justice and the Complexity of Life 2001 
 Released in the US with the title: The Cooperative Gene: How Mendel's Demon Explains the Evolution of Complex Beings 2001 
 Animal Behavior: An Introduction to Behavioral Mechanisms, Development, and Ecology 1995 
 The Problems of Evolution 1985 
 The Darwin Reader (Second Edition) 1996 
 How to Read Darwin 2006 
 Evolution and classification: The reformation of cladism 1986 
 Narrow Roads of Geneland (with W. D. Hamilton) 2006 
 The Explanation of Organic Diversity: The Comparative Method and Adaptations for Mating 1983 
 Oxford Surveys in Evolutionary Biology: 1985 (with Richard Dawkins) Vol. 2 1986 , Vol. 3 1987 
 Animal Behaviour: A Concise Introduction 1995 
 Richard Dawkins: How a Scientist Changed the Way We Think (editor, with Alan Grafen) 2007

References

1956 births
Living people
British zoologists
Charles Darwin biographers
Critics of creationism
British evolutionary biologists
Modern synthesis (20th century)